Al-Khafsah Subdistrict  is a subdistrict of Manbij District in Aleppo Governorate of northern Syria. The administrative centre is the town of Al-Khafsah.

At the 2004 census, the subdistrict had a population of 92,368.

References 

Manbij District
Al-Khafsah